The Best is Yūko Andō's first compilation album, released on April 15, 2009. It was released in two formats: 2CD and CD+DVD. All the songs were re-mastered by Ted Jensen.

Track listing

Charts

Oricon Sales Chart

Physical Sales Charts

References 

2009 greatest hits albums
Yūko Andō (singer) albums
Avex Group compilation albums